Justice Garwood may refer to:

William Lockhart Garwood (1931–2011), associate justice of the Supreme Court of Texas
W. St. John Garwood (1896–1987), associate justice of the Supreme Court of Texas